Zygonoides fraseri is a species of dragonfly in the family Libellulidae. It is found in Ghana and Uganda. Its natural habitats are dry savanna, subtropical or tropical dry shrubland, and rivers.

References

Libellulidae
Insects described in 1956
Taxa named by Elliot Pinhey
Taxonomy articles created by Polbot